Hudson Almshouse, also known as the Hudson Lunatic Asylum, Hudson Orphan and Relief Association, and Hudson Area Association Library, is a historic almshouse located at Hudson, Columbia County, New York. It was built about 1818, with a substantial rear addition built between about 1884 and 1889. It consists of a three-story central section with two-story flanking wings constructed of dressed limestone. Originally built as an almshouse, it subsequently served as a mental health asylum, female academy, private home, and from 1959 to 2016, the local association library.

It was added to the National Register of Historic Places in 2008.

References

External links
Hudson Area Library website

Government buildings on the National Register of Historic Places in New York (state)
Federal architecture in New York (state)
Government buildings completed in 1818
Buildings and structures in Columbia County, New York
National Register of Historic Places in Columbia County, New York